Turner Hall may refer to:

in the United States (by state)
Turner Town Hall, West Chicago, Illinois, listed on the NRHP in DuPage County, Illinois
Turner Hall (Postville, Iowa), listed on the NRHP in Allamakee County, Iowa
Northwest Davenport Turner Society Hall, listed on the NRHP in Scott County, Iowa
Eldridge Turn-Halle, listed on the NRHP in Scott County, Iowa 
Turner's Hall, New Orleans, Louisiana, listed on the NRHP in Orleans Parish, Louisiana
Turner Hall (New Ulm, Minnesota), listed on the NRHP in Brown County, Minnesota
Turner Hall (Milwaukee, Wisconsin), a National Historic Landmark in Milwaukee County, Wisconsin
Turner Hall, old concert hall of Dallas Symphony Orchestra

See also
Turner House (disambiguation)
Turners

Architectural disambiguation pages